Metrocenter was a regional enclosed shopping mall in northwest Phoenix, Arizona. It was bounded by Interstate 17, 31st, Dunlap and Peoria Avenues. Before its closure, the three most recently open anchor stores were Harkins Theatres, Walmart Supercenter, and Dillard's Clearance Center; three additional vacant anchor stores included former Sears, JCPenney, and Macy's locations. The mall featured 100 stores, a 12 screen movie theater, and a food court. Since January 2021, the mall had been owned by the Carlyle Development Group based in New York City. The mall officially closed on June 30, 2020.

Parts of the film Bill and Ted's Excellent Adventure were filmed in the mall.

History

Development 
Metrocenter was a joint venture of Westcor, a regional shopping center development firm headed by a group of real estate investors and developers led by Russ "Rusty" Lyon, Jr., and Homart Development Company, the real estate division of Sears, Roebuck and Company.  The project was announced in November 1970, the first site plans and artist renderings announced in the spring of 1972, and construction beginning in June 1972. The mall was designed by local architect Robert Fairburn who headed the Phoenix offices of Flatow, Moore Bryan & Fairburn. Ernest W. Hahn was general contractor selected to build the mall. The Broadway building was designed by Charles Luckman, and was constructed by the Del E. Webb Corporation.

Lyon's firm correctly noted that population growth would favor northwest Phoenix. After the site was chosen, "...from then on, it was a matter of appealing to the marketing acumen of the major department stores. They didn't take much convincing."

There was some initial opposition to the project from neighborhood residents who feared heavy traffic generated from major retailers as well as buildings which exceeded height limits. As a result, there were some delays in the rezoning of the land by the city of Phoenix, but residents' fears were eventually addressed to their satisfaction. A lawsuit filed by the "Deer Valley Residents Association" was dropped by late September 1972.

In June 1972, the First National Bank of Arizona (now the Arizona operations of Wells Fargo Bank) made a $21 million loan to the developers, which was the largest commercial real estate loan ever made in Arizona up to that time. The total cost of Metrocenter was estimated at $100 million.

The mall was opened for business in Early 1973, and when it opened as the first two-level, five-anchor mall in the U.S., it was the largest shopping center in Arizona and was considered one of the largest shopping centers in the United States. Shoppers initially came from as far away as Flagstaff and Tucson to see and to shop at the large mall.

Metrocenter became the model for later Westcor master-planned developments around Phoenix, such as Paradise Valley Mall.

Decline and renovations
The mall started to decline economically after the 1980s; as the Phoenix area expanded, many of the immediate residential neighborhoods bordering Metrocenter became less middle-class/upscale and more working-class in demographics. Newer malls, such as Paradise Valley Mall and Fiesta Mall seized market share from Metrocenter in the Phoenix Metropolitan Area. In addition to increased competition, crime in the mall's neighborhood and parking lot increased. Local car enthusiasts started cruising the mall in the early ‘80s, driving their cars around the property and socializing. Later Phoenix Police began blocking traffic for the "cruisers", which also inconvenienced mall goers and led to a decline in weekend patronage.

In 1992–93 Metrocenter underwent a renovation that was completed by The Weitz Company General Contractors.

In January 2004, Metrocenter was sold by DVM Co., a joint venture of Simon Property Group and Rusty Lyon, Jr., to a joint venture of The Macerich Company and AEW Capital Management. The new ownership brought back the founding developer, Westcor, by now an Arizona retail giant and subsidiary of The Macerich Co., to manage the property.

In 2005, several of the mall's retail stores that appeared in Bill and Ted's Excellent Adventure, such as Oshman's Sporting Goods and Casual Corner, closed in accordance with the chains' foldings, and were replaced by newer stores. Facing large vacancies, in 2005–2006, the exterior of the mall was improved. The parking lot was repaved and 35 percent more lighting was added. New "Metrocenter" signs were placed above the mall's entrances. More than 300 trees were removed (most of them eucalyptus) and desert-friendly landscaping was planted.

Metrocenter's interior was revamped in 2007. Diaper-changing stations and attendants were added to the restrooms. A nursing room, Wi-Fi access, and a community room with seating for up to 100 were added to the mall. The food court and play center were remodeled. In November 2007, a closed-circuit camera television system was installed that is sophisticated enough to read the license plate number of any car in the mall's parking lot. Public view monitors were installed at the entrances to the mall showing that entrance to people as they entered the mall.

On April 6, 2010 Jones Lang LaSalle took over management and 15% ownership of Metrocenter Mall from Westcor.

Redevelopment 
Later in 2010, the mall was put up for sale and in January 2012, the sale to the Carlyle Development Group for $12.2 million was finalized. The company had publicly stated that over a period of five to six years, it hoped to turn the property into a mixed-use development site, with retail, residential, medical and possibly college campus tenants.

In June 2016, a massive redevelopment of Metrocenter was approved by the Phoenix City Council. Metrocenter will undergo a massive revitalization that will bring more retail and restaurants as well as office buildings, apartments, senior housing, and health-care facilities to the mall.

The City of Phoenix rezoned the mall to allow office, medical and residential space; it had been zoned for solely retail use.

Closure 
In a letter from general manager Kim Ramirez on June 19, 2020, Metrocenter Mall announced that they would be closing at the end of that month citing "the drop in our occupancy levels due to the COVID-19 pandemic."
After 47 years of service, Metro Center Mall was closed on June 30, 2020, due to low store occupancy levels following the COVID-19 pandemic, and failed rejuvenation projects to boost foot traffic. Remains of the mall were auctioned off on December 3, 2020. The mall is set to be demolished in 2022 as part of a $750 million redevelopment project that will replace the mall with other retail space, apartments, and services.

Anchors
The original anchor stores were Sears, Rhodes Brothers, Diamond's, Goldwater's, and The Broadway. All of the anchors opened in 1973, with the exception of Sears which opened in 1974. The mall had an ice skating rink on the ground level overlooked by the mall's food court, which was designed to resemble the fuselage of an airliner. 

The ice rink closed in 1990, the large space where it once sat was filled, and the balcony that overlooked it was filled to house more seating in the food court. The food court was also redesigned and now no longer resembles an airliner fuselage. In 1974, the mall opened a triple-screen movie theater by General Cinema Corporation. The theater was acquired by Harkins Theatres in March 1999, and converted to a 12-screen theater.

Over time, the mall's anchors have changed as a result of acquisitions and consolidation amongst department stores. Diamond's was converted to Dillard's in 1984. Rhodes Brothers was converted to Liberty House in 1974, then to Joske's in 1984. After Joske's was acquired by Dillard's in early 1987, the location became a second Dillard's, and then a JCPenney. JCPenney moved to Christown Spectrum Mall in 2007 and left the former location of JCPenney vacant until Metrocenter's ultimate closure.

The Broadway was acquired by Federated Department Stores in 1996, and converted to a Macy's. Goldwater's was converted to J.W. Robinson's in 1989, which became Robinsons-May in 1993. In 2005, Macy's closed its store at the former Broadway site, which returned to the mall a year later, at the Robinsons-May building after the May Department Stores were acquired by Macy's in 2006. In January 2015, Macy's announced it was closing its Metrocenter location for the second time in ten years by early spring, citing a nationwide reorganization. The store closed in June.

Dillard's was converted to a clearance center in 2009, closing the first level of its store.

In June 2014, it was announced that a Walmart Supercenter would open, taking over the space occupied by the vacant Broadway building. The Broadway building was demolished and construction for the Supercenter began on July 20, 2016. The new Supercenter opened in October 2017, though it is not accessible from the mall.

On May 31, 2018, it was announced that Sears would be closing in September 2018 as part of a plan to close 72 stores nationwide, which left the mall without any original anchors. Only Dillard's Clearance Center and Walmart Supercenter (which has no mall entrance) are the remaining anchors.

On February 22, 2023, it was announced that Dillard’s Clearance Center would be closing by March 31 as part of a plan to close 3 stores nationwide. This leaves Walmart Supercenter as the only business operating on the property.

List of anchor stores

References

 Arizona Republic:
  September 30, 1973, p. K1
  September 1, 1972
  June 9, 1972
 May 6, 2006
 July 25, 2008 
  
  
  
 
 
 

Shopping malls in Arizona
1973 establishments in Arizona
2020 disestablishments in Arizona
Buildings and structures in Phoenix, Arizona
JLL (company)
Companies disestablished due to the COVID-19 pandemic
Shopping malls in Maricopa County, Arizona
Tourist attractions in Phoenix, Arizona
Shopping malls established in 1973
Defunct shopping malls in the United States
Shopping malls disestablished in 2020